Songs 2 is the sixteenth studio album by the British singer-songwriter Judie Tzuke, released in 2008.

As with her previous album, Songs 1 (2007), Songs 2 includes songs that Tzuke wrote with other artists. Whereas Songs 1 contained some of the "quieter" songs from these collaborations, Songs 2 contains the louder, more energised ones.

Track listing
 "While She Sleeps" (Judie Tzuke, Ben Mark)
 "Break Your Skin" (Judie Tzuke, Ben Mark)
 "Wise Up" (Judie Tzuke, Peter Kearns)
 "Modified" (Judie Tzuke, David P Goodes)
 "After The Crash" (Judie Tzuke, David P Goodes)
 "Boots" (Judie Tzuke, David P Goodes)
 "Pot of Gold" (Judie Tzuke, David P Goodes)
 "Won't Do It Twice" (Judie Tzuke, Jamie Norton)
 "Faith" (Judie Tzuke, Ben Mark)
 "What's It All For" (Judie Tzuke, David P Goodes)
 "You Know Who You Are" (Judie Tzuke, David P Goodes)

References
Official website

2008 albums
Judie Tzuke albums